Roxburghshire was a Scottish county constituency of the House of Commons of the Parliament of Great Britain (at Westminster) from 1708 to 1801, and of the Parliament of the United Kingdom (also at Westminster) from 1801 to 1918.

Creation
The British parliamentary constituency was created in 1708 following the Acts of Union, 1707 and replaced the former Parliament of Scotland shire constituency of Roxburghshire.

Boundaries 
The name relates the constituency to the county of Roxburgh.

History
The constituency elected one Member of Parliament (MP) by the first past the post system until the seat was abolished in 1918.

When the constituency was abolished in 1918, the Roxburgh and Selkirk constituency was created, covering the counties of Roxburgh and Selkirk

Members of Parliament

Election results

Elections in the 1830s

Elections in the 1840s

Elections in the 1850s

Elections in the 1860s

Elections in the 1870s
Scott resigned, causing a by-election.

Elections in the 1880s

Elections in the 1890s

Elections in the 1900s

Elections in the 1910s

References 

Historic parliamentary constituencies in Scotland (Westminster)
Politics of the Scottish Borders
Constituencies of the Parliament of the United Kingdom disestablished in 1918
Constituencies of the Parliament of the United Kingdom established in 1708
Roxburgh